Kristina Andersson (born 20 May 1965) is a Swedish former alpine skier who competed in the 1988 Winter Olympics, 1992 Winter Olympics, and 1994 Winter Olympics.

She won one World Cup competition, a slalom competition in Maribor, Slovenia.

World Cup competition victories

References

External links
 

1965 births
Living people
Swedish female alpine skiers
Olympic alpine skiers of Sweden
Alpine skiers at the 1988 Winter Olympics
Alpine skiers at the 1992 Winter Olympics
Alpine skiers at the 1994 Winter Olympics